Gharwali Baharwali (translation: Wife and Mistress) is a 1998 Indian comedy drama film directed by David Dhawan and produced by Tutu Sharma. It stars Anil Kapoor, Raveena Tandon and Rambha in pivotal roles. The film is a remake of the Tamil film Thaikulame Thaikulame (1995).

Plot
Arun (Anil Kapoor), a 28 year old man, is married to Kaajal (Raveena Tandon) and they have been trying to conceive a child for some time. After going for some tests, the doctor (Asrani) informs them that they cannot, and this is due to Arun's "shortcomings". However, the doctor then secretly confesses to Arun that it is in fact Kaajal who cannot conceive, and he lied to spare her from the shock .

Arun's father, Hiralal (Kader Khan) discovers this and tries to force Arun to marry again as he wants a grandchild - however, Arun refuses to remarry and insists on staying with Kaajal.

3 years later

One day, Jumbo (Satish Kaushik) and Arun go to Nepal, were Jumbo comes across a girl, Manisha (Rambha), who is about to be publicly disgraced. He arranges the girl's freedom by stating that Arun will marry the girl - without conferring with Arun. Arun attends the wedding ceremony, unbeknownst to him that he is in fact the groom and the ceremony is being performed around him, owed essentially to the fact that they were speaking a different language and the ceremony was different from that in India.

Shortly after the ceremony, he discovers that he is now married to Manisha, and had been tricked into doing so by Jumbo. Arun returns to India, where he remains in contact with Manisha, learning that she is pregnant, and  learns to speak fluent Hindi from their mutual friend Gopal (Tiku Talsania), whom they met in Nepal. Hiralal now desperately wants a grandchild to lighten up his life, so he requests the couple to adopt a child. However, by this time - Arun now has a child with Manisha in Nepal and proceeds to adopt the child with Kajaal - named Rinku - and "employ" Manisha in their house as a maid to allow Manisha to be near her son - all unknown to Kaajal.

Hiralal discovers that Manisha is in fact Arun's wife and Rinku is their blood-child and begins to secretly dote upon Manisha, while Kajaal criticizes the relationship that the "employer and servant" shared. One evening, after Hiralal and Manisha return from the cinema, Kajaal confronts her father-in-law as to why he is favoring the house-maid over his own daughter-in-law; out of anger, Kajaal attempts to throw Manisha out of the house and accusing them of having and illicit affair. Arun slaps Kaajal in an act of domestic violence and then declares that Manisha has just as much right to the house as she does, and even more right to be with Rinku than Kaajal - as his second wife and Rinku's biological mother.

The story concludes with everyone accepting the situation of polygyny and living together.

Cast
 Anil Kapoor as Arun H. Verma, Kajal and Manisha's husband, Rinku's father.
 Raveena Tandon as Kaajal A. Verma, Arun's first wife, Rinku's step-mother
 Rambha as Manisha A. Verma, Arun's second wife, Rinku's mother
 Satish Kaushik as Jumbo
 Kader Khan as Hiralal Verma, Arun's father, Kajal and Manish's father in law, Rinku's grandfather. 
 Tiku Talsania as Ram Gopal
 Asrani as Doctor Ved
 Rakesh Bedi as Chopra
 Dina Pathak as Dadi Maa
 Shehzad Khan
 Madhuri Dixit as Special Appearance
 Benny Pradhan
 A. K. Rana
 Master Shahrukh

Soundtrack

References

External links
 

1990s Hindi-language films
1998 films
Films directed by David Dhawan
Films set in Nepal
Hindi remakes of Tamil films
Films shot in Nepal
Polygamy in fiction
Comedy of remarriage films
Films scored by Anu Malik